Christina Linhardt is a German-American singer, actor, and director, best known for her roles in the production of the film Guantanamo Circus, and as the former fiancée of Prince Daniel of Saxony.

Linhardt produced, directed, and wrote Guantanamo Circus, which won a Hollywood F.A.M.E. Award for "Documentary of the Year," and was selected by the Library of Congress for inclusion in its permanent collection. The film also won an LA Music Award for its music score by Linhardt. She is staff writer for the California Philharmonic Orchestra. 

Linhardt has released two music CDs: Circus Sanctuary and Voodoo Princess. She performs on vocals and flute with the Angels of Venice, and has been interviewed on LA Talk Radio, KPFK Radio and KPC Radio. Linhardt played the role of "Party Girl" in Movie 43. She starred opposite Maximilian Schell in a production of Goethe's Faust Comes to Grand Avernue, for which she was also associate producer.

The daughter of scholar, historian, playwright, and biographer Cornelius Schnauber, Linhardt grew up in the company of notable Swiss writers such as Friedrich Dürrenmatt, Hugo Loetscher, and Peter Bichsel. She attended the Goethe Institute in Berlin, later studying French at the Eurocentre in Paris, drama and movement at Oxford University, and went on to achieve her diploma in singing with a minor in theater science at the University of Southern California. She currently lives in Los Angeles.

References

External links 
 All Music Discography
 

American artists
Living people
Year of birth missing (living people)
American women singers